Brandon Naurato is an American former ice hockey player and current interim head coach for Michigan.

Playing career
Naurato's college career began in the fall of 2005 when joined the ice hockey team at Michigan. He played for legendary head coach Red Berenson during a very successful time for the program. Naurato provided depth scoring for a Wolverine team that won 109 games during his 4-year tenure, making the NCAA tournament each season. After graduating with a degree in general studies, Naurato played professional hockey for parts of 4 seasons. He saw some success at the lower levels of the sport but decided to hang up his skates after the 2012 season.

Coaching career
Following his playing career, Naurato worked for USA Hockey as the Director of player Development for almost eight years. Near the end of his stint with the organization, he took on additional responsibilities as a player development consultant with the Detroit Red Wings. In August of 2021, after former assistant Kris Mayotte was hired to be the head coach at Colorado College, Naurato joined the staff at his alma mater. During the 2022 offseason, Michigan's head coach, Mel Pearson, was accused of mistreating both players and staff during his tenure with the Wolverines. In early August, Pearson was dismissed from his position and the program scrambled to find his replacement. Because the vacancy happened so close to the start of the next season, the Wolverines were not able to perform a typical hiring search. On August 7, 2022, Michigan promoted Naurato to interim head coach for the 2022–23 season.

Career statistics

Head coaching record

References

External links

1985 births
American ice hockey coaches
American ice hockey forwards
Living people
Ice hockey people from Michigan
People from Livonia, Michigan
Cedar Rapids RoughRiders players
Omaha Lancers players
Michigan Wolverines men's ice hockey players
Michigan Wolverines men's ice hockey coaches
Stockton Thunder players
Toledo Walleye players
Port Huron Icehawks players
Fort Wayne Komets players
Dayton Gems (2009–2012) players